Santa Rosa is a city in Ecuador located in the Santa Rosa Canton of El Oro Province. It is located in the south of the coastal region of Ecuador, in an extensive plain, on the right bank of the Santa Rosa River.

Transport
Santa Rosa counts with the Santa Rosa International Airport, formerly known as the South Ecuador International Airport. Planning for the airport began in 2002.

Festivities
The festivities in Santa Rosa are celebrated every year in August and last ten days. Events take place in front of the main Catholic Church where tourists can witness fireworks, folk music, typical dances, and local traditional games.

Schools
High Schools
Colegio National Tecnico Jambeli,
Colegio Zoila Ugarte de Landivar,
Colegio Wenceslay Oyague.

Middle schools and Elementaries
Herminia Grunauer,
Santa Teresita,
Sucre,
Alcidez Pesantes,
Wenceslao.

See also
Santa Rosa (Spanish Wikipedia)

References

External links
 http://www.misantarosa.com
 Summary by Ecuadorian Ministry of Transportation and Public Works of new airport project, Dec. 2009.

Populated places in El Oro Province